Saint Alexander was a martyr and companion of Saint Pothinus. Alexander was a physician in Vienne, Gaul, when he converted to Christianity.  He was arrested during the persecutions conducted under Emperor Marcus Aurelius. Along with Pothinus and forty-six other Christians, Alexander was tortured and executed. As part of this group, Alexander is one of the Martyrs of Lyons and Vienne.

References

Converts to Christianity from pagan religions
French Roman Catholic saints
2nd-century Christian martyrs
177 deaths
Year of birth unknown